Harry Goldsworthy may refer to:

 Harry E. Goldsworthy (1914–2022), American Air Force general 
 Harry Goldsworthy (American football) (1883–1970), American college football player and coach